Sandford C. Faulkner (March 3, 1803August 4, 1874), better known as Sandy Faulkner, was an American planter, raconteur and fiddler who personified the mid-19th century folk song "Arkansas Traveler," for which he received writing credit. It has since gone on to become the official state historic song of Arkansas.

Biography 
Sandford C. Faulkner was born in Georgetown, Kentucky on March 3, 1803 to Nicholas and Sally ( Fletcher) Faulkner. He was responsible in large part for the story forming the basis of the "Arkansas Traveler", which was the official song of Arkansas from 1949 to 1963, and the state historical song since 1987. During the American Civil War, he served as an artillery officer detailed to ordnance duty in the Trans-Mississippi Department of the Confederate States Army.

Honors 
Faulkner County, Arkansas (established 1873) is named after him.

Notes

References

Further reading

External links 

 Official
 Faulkner Family Papers at UALR Center for Arkansas History and Culture
 General information
 
 
 

 
1803 births
1874 deaths
19th-century American composers
19th-century American Episcopalians
19th-century American male musicians
19th-century storytellers
American male composers
American militia officers
American slave owners
American storytellers
Arkansas Democrats
Burials at Mount Holly Cemetery
Composers for fiddle
Confederate States Army officers
Deaths from typhoid fever
Deaths in Arkansas
Episcopalians from Arkansas
Farmers from Arkansas
Faulkner County, Arkansas
Folk musicians from Arkansas
Military personnel from Arkansas
Musicians from Little Rock, Arkansas
People from Chicot County, Arkansas
People from Georgetown, Kentucky
People of Arkansas in the American Civil War
People of the Brooks–Baxter War
Recipients of American presidential pardons
Southern old-time fiddlers